Isonoe , also known as , is a retrograde irregular satellite of Jupiter. It was discovered by a team of astronomers from the University of Hawaii led by Scott S. Sheppard in 2000, and given the temporary designation .

Isonoe is about 4 kilometres in diameter, and orbits Jupiter at an average distance of 23,833,000 km in 688.61 days, at an inclination of 166° to the ecliptic (169° to Jupiter's equator), in a retrograde direction and with an eccentricity of 0.166.

It was named in October 2002 after Isonoe, one of the Danaïdes in Greek mythology, and a lover of Zeus (Jupiter).

Isonoe belongs to the Carme group, made up of irregular retrograde moons orbiting Jupiter at a distance ranging between 23 and 24 Gm and at an inclination of about 165°.

References

Carme group
Moons of Jupiter
Irregular satellites
Discoveries by Scott S. Sheppard
Discoveries by David C. Jewitt
Discoveries by Yanga R. Fernandez
Discoveries by Eugene A. Magnier
20001123
Moons with a retrograde orbit